Harpalus pusillus is a species of ground beetle in the subfamily Harpalinae. It was described by Victor Motschulsky in 1850.

References

pusillus
Beetles described in 1850